France–Kosovo relations are the bilateral relations between the French Republic and the Republic of Kosovo. When Kosovo declared its independence from Serbia on 17 February 2008, France became one of the first countries to announce officially about recognition of sovereign Kosovo.  France has an embassy in Pristina. Kosovo has an embassy in Paris. The two countries enjoy very good and friendly relations.

Political relations 

For many years, France has played an important role in finding a solution to the issue of Kosovo's status. Accordingly, French Minister of Foreign and European Affairs Bernard Kouchner was the first UN Special Representative of the Secretary General for Kosovo when the United Nations took over from Serbia in June 1999 in administration of the territory. This involvement, both civilian and military, has continued ever since, promoting democratisation, compliance with the rights of all communities and especially the Serbian community, now very much a minority, and a European rapprochement. France's presence has remained quite considerable within UNMIK and KFOR, with more than 2,000 soldiers out of a total of 16,000 (i.e. the second-largest contingent).

From a political standpoint, as a member of the Contact Group, France has played a key role in the negotiations on Kosovo's status and, within the European Union, to reach  a consensus on the deployment of the EULEX mission. Mr. Bernard Kouchner has been very involved in the search for an agreement, relaying the actions of the French President, who had proposed during the G8 summit in July 2008 designating the troika tasked with restarting a final phase of negotiations between Belgrade and Pristina in August 2007. In particular, the minister went to the two parties in July 2007, before receiving his Serbian counterpart and the Kosovan negotiation team (President, Prime Minister and heads of the main parties) in Paris in November, to encourage them to compromise.

France recognised Kosovo's independence on 18 February.

France intends to pursue its actions promoting stability in the Balkans and the development of Kosovo. The French KFOR contingent, tasked with the country's security, will be maintained. KFOR is led by French General Xavier Bout de Marnhac until September 2008. France will send a large contingent of police officers, judges, judicial experts, and prison and customs staff to the EULEX mission, which will be led by one of its compatriots, Mr. Yves de Kermabon. Finally, France will continue its involvement in the International Steering Group, tasked with watching over the implementation of the provisions of the Ahtisaari plan.

Military
France participated in the 1999 NATO bombing of Yugoslavia, which resulted in a UN administration of Kosovo and then to eventual independence. France currently has 1,368 troops serving in Kosovo as peacekeepers in the NATO led Kosovo Force. Originally, there were 7,000 French troops in KFOR. Marcel Valentin was the 6th KFOR Commander from 3 October 2001 until 4 October 2002. Yves de Kermabon was the 9th KFOR Commander from 1 September 2004 until 1 September 2005. Xavier de Marnhac was the 12th KFOR Commander from 31 August 2007 until 29 August 2008.

See also 
 Foreign relations of France
 Foreign relations of Kosovo
 France–Serbia relations
 France–Yugoslavia relations

Notes and references
Notes:

References:

External links 
 French Ministry of Foreign Affairs about relations with Kosovo 

 
Bilateral relations of Kosovo
Kosovo